Lund Central Station or Lund C is the main railway station of Lund, Sweden. It is located on the Southern Main Line and the West Coast Line.

As of 2007 it is connected by railway to Kävlinge (Helsingborg, Gothenburg), Eslöv (Kristianstad, Kalmar, Stockholm) and Malmö (Copenhagen, Helsingør). There were previously direct railway connections to Bjärred, Trelleborg and Harlösa.

The station building was built in the 1850s. An expansion during 1872-1875 was drawn by Adolf Wilhelm Edelsvärd and another expansion 1923-1926 was drawn by Folke Zettervall.

This station is the terminus of the Lund tramway.

Railway stations in Lund
Buildings and structures in Lund
Listed buildings in Sweden
Railway stations on the Southern Main Line
Railway stations on the West Coast Line (Sweden)
Railway stations opened in 1858
1858 establishments in Sweden
19th-century establishments in Skåne County
Transit centers in Sweden